Astartea transversa is a shrub endemic to Western Australia.

The shrub is found along the south coast in the Great Southern  region of Western Australia around Albany.

References

Eudicots of Western Australia
transversa
Endemic flora of Western Australia
Plants described in 2013
Taxa named by Barbara Lynette Rye